The International Journal of Gynecology & Obstetrics is a monthly peer-reviewed medical journal covering obstetrics and gynecology. It was established in 1963 as the Journal of the International Federation of Gynecology and Obstetrics, obtaining its current name in 1969. It is published by Wiley-Blackwell on behalf of the International Federation of Gynecology and Obstetrics, of which it is the official journal. The editor-in-chief is Prof Michael Geary (Rotunda Hospital, Ireland). According to the Journal Citation Reports, the journal has a 2021 impact factor of 4.447.

References

External links

Obstetrics and gynaecology journals
Academic journals associated with international learned and professional societies of Europe
Monthly journals
Wiley-Blackwell academic journals
Publications established in 1963
English-language journals